Chela Cordero (born  Zaira Cordero in Mendoza, 1892 - March 24, 1982 in Buenos Aires) was an Argentine actress. In 1943 she starred in Benito Perojo's Stella. She also appeared in films like I Win the War (1943), El pecado de Julia (1946) and Edición extra (1949). She was married to Luis Sandrini.

Selected filmography
 The Sin of Julia (1946)

References

External links
 

Argentine film actresses
1892 births
1982 deaths
People from Mendoza, Argentina